This is a list of the National Register of Historic Places listings in Bighorn Canyon National Recreation Area.

This is intended to be a complete list of the properties and districts on the National Register of Historic Places in Bighorn Canyon National Recreation Area, Montana and Wyoming, United States.  The locations of National Register properties and districts for which the latitude and longitude coordinates are included below, may be seen in a Google map.

There are eight properties and districts listed on the National Register in the park.

Current listings 

|--
|}

See also 
 National Register of Historic Places listings in Big Horn County, Montana
 National Register of Historic Places listings in Carbon County, Montana
 National Register of Historic Places listings in Big Horn County, Wyoming
 National Register of Historic Places listings in Montana
 National Register of Historic Places listings in Wyoming

References 

Bighorn Canyon National Recreation Area